The 1994–95 FA Cup (known as The FA Cup sponsored by Littlewoods for sponsorship reasons) was the 114th staging of the FA Cup. The competition was won by Everton, with a shock victory over Manchester United, who were strong favourites to retain the title. This tournament was the 50th to be officially held since the six-year suspension due to World War II.  Everton's Joe Royle would be the last English-born manager to lift the FA Cup until Harry Redknapp managed Portsmouth to the 2008 victory. As of 2023, this is the most recent major trophy won by Everton.

This was the first FA Cup season to bear a title sponsor.

Calendar

First round proper

Port Vale and Burnley from the Football League First Division entered in this round along with all the Football League Second and Third Division teams plus four non-league clubs were given byes to this round: Woking, Runcorn, Kidderminster Harriers and Bath City. The matches were played on 12 November 1994. There were eleven replays, with one tie requiring a penalty shootout to settle it.

Second round proper

The second round of the competition featured the winners of the first round ties. The matches were played on 3 December 1994, with five replays and no penalty shootouts required.

Third round proper

The third round of the season's FA Cup was scheduled for 7 January and marked the point at which the teams in the two highest divisions in the English league system, the Premier League and the Football League First Division (now known as the Football League Championship) -except Port Vale and Burnley-. There were twelve replays, with one of these games going to penalties to settle it.

Fourth round proper

The fourth round featured the thirty-two winning teams from the previous round, and was played on the weekend of 28 January. There were five replays and two penalty shootouts.

Fifth round proper

The eight fifth round ties were played on the weekend of 18 February, with three replays being required.

Sixth round proper

The sixth round proper, or quarter-finals, ties were scheduled for the weekend of 11 March. The Crystal Palace–Wolverhampton Wanderers match went to a replay 11 days later.

Tottenham Hotspur progressed to the semi-finals of a competition that they had to appeal to compete in after being banned for financial irregularities, and their quarter-final victory over Liverpool ended their opposition's hopes of an FA Cup/League Cup double.

Wolverhampton Wanderers, the last non-Premiership side in the competition, lost 4–1 at home to Crystal Palace in a replay after a 1–1 draw in the first game.

QPR's hopes of instant success under new player-manager Ray Wilkins were ended when they were beaten 2–0 by Manchester United, one of his former clubs.

Replay

Semi-finals

Manchester United, also chasing the Premier League title, needed a replay to see off a Crystal Palace side who were battling against relegation.

Everton, meanwhile, blew apart a Tottenham side who had started the season banned from the competition for financial irregularities until an appeal saw them reinstated.

Replay

Final

The final was contested between Manchester United and Everton at Wembley Stadium, London on 20 May 1995. Everton won the match 1–0 through a Paul Rideout goal after half an hour. It was the first time in six years that United were left without a major trophy, while Everton had won their first major trophy in eight years.

Media coverage
For the seventh consecutive season in the United Kingdom, the BBC were the free to air broadcasters while Sky Sports were the subscription broadcasters.

The matches shown live on the BBC were: Newcastle United vs Blackburn Rovers (R3); Sunderland vs Tottenham Hotspur (R4); Manchester United vs Leeds United (R5); Everton vs Newcastle United (QF); Everton vs Tottenham Hotspur (SF) and Everton vs Manchester United (Final)

External links
BBC FA Cup news
1994–95 FA Cup Archive on FA website
Resource detailing results for each team (source for penalty shootout results)

 
FA Cup seasons
Fa Cup, 1994-95
1994–95 in English football